Marios Louka (born December 9, 1982) is a Cypriot footballer playing for Karmiotissa Polemidion. He previously played for Ayia Napa F.C., Nea Salamina, Ermis Aradippou, AEL Limassol and APOEL.

References

1982 births
Living people
Cypriot footballers
Association football midfielders
Cyprus under-21 international footballers
Nea Salamis Famagusta FC players
APOEL FC players
AEL Limassol players
Ermis Aradippou FC players
AEK Kouklia F.C. players
Ayia Napa FC players
Cypriot First Division players
Karmiotissa FC players